Jacques Velard is a French retired slalom canoeist who competed in the early-to-mid 1950s. He won a bronze medal in the C-1 team event at the 1953 ICF Canoe Slalom World Championships in Meran.

References

French male canoeists
Possibly living people
Year of birth missing
Medalists at the ICF Canoe Slalom World Championships